The Reverend Revett Sheppard (1778, in Campsey Ash – 1830, in Wrabness) was an English malacologist. He was a Fellow of the Linnean Society. He described several new non-marine species of mollusks.

Sheppard was a friend of the entomologist William Kirby.

Publications
Sheppard's publications include:
Sheppard, R., 1822. On two new British species of Mytilus. Transactions of the Linnean Society of London 13: 83-87.
Sheppard, R., 1823. Descriptions of seven new British land and freshwater shells, with observations on many other species, including a list of such as have been found in the county of Suffolk. Transactions of the Linnean Society of London 14: 148-170.

References
 Killeen, I. J., 1992. The land and freshwater molluscs of Suffolk. Suffolk Naturalists' Society, Ipswich.
 Revett Sheppard is listed (alphabetically) on page 811 of "2,400 Years of Malacology" published online by the American Malacological Society

English zoologists
1830 deaths
1778 births
English malacologists
People from Suffolk Coastal (district)